František Šolc (June 25, 1920 – March 11, 1996) was a Czech French hornist and horn teacher.

Life 
He was born in Přerov on 25 June 1920. He grew up in a musical environment; his father was a music director (Kapellmeister) of the local city orchestra. In 1935 Šolc enrolled voluntarily in a military music school in Prague. In 1939 he was accepted into the Brno Conservatory of Music as horn performance major in the class of Professor Kohout. He was solo horn player with the Symphony Orchestra of the Greater Brno Region. During that period he became a founding member of the Brno Woodwind Quintet. He graduated from the Janáček Academy of Music and Dramatic Arts in 1951. Until 1964 he worked as a lecturer in horn at the Brno Conservatory of Music, and 1964 became a lecturer at the Janáček Academy of Music in Brno.
Frantisek Šolc elevated the tradition of the Brno School of Horn playing to a world standard. His former students won many first prizes in national and international horn competitions and excelled in horn sections in best Czech orchestras. Known for his teaching skills, he was the director for several summers of the International Interpretation Festival of Czech Music, attended by horn players from around the globe. In addition to his Janáček Academy post, he occasionally taught at the Academy of Music and Dramatic Arts in Prague and Bratislava. He regularly served as adjudicator at national and international horn competitions. After Professor Frantisek Kudláček died, Šolc served as Deputy Director of the Janáček Academy of Music and Dramatic Arts in Brno from 27 August 1972 until 1 September 1973. After 1 September 1972 and through 31 August 1987, he served as the Academy's Director.

External links
 Czech info 

1920 births
1996 deaths
Musicians from Přerov
Czech classical horn players
20th-century classical musicians
Czechoslovak musicians
Brno Conservatory alumni